D50, D-50 or D 50 may refer to:

 CIE Standard Illuminant D50, a lighting standard used in colorimetry, and also in graphic design as a white point
 D50, in particle size distribution measurements, the mass-median-diameter, considered to be the average particle size by mass.
 D50 (radiotherapy), the half maximal inhibitory dose, representing the dose of light or ionising radiation that is required for 50% inactivation of a tumor cell population
 D50 road (Croatia), a state route
 Dodge D50, a compact pickup truck marketed by Chrysler and based on the Mitsubishi Triton
 the ICD-10 code for iron deficiency anemia 
 An intravenous sugar solution of 50% dextrose
 Invisible D50, a keyboard stand
 JNR Class D50, a pre-war Japanese steam locomotives class related to the D60 steam locomotive class
 Lancia D50, a Formula One racing car driven by Juan Manuel Fangio to win the 1956 World Driver's Championship
 New South Wales D50 class locomotive, a NSWGR steam locomotive
 Nikon D50, an entry-level digital SLR camera
 Roland D-50, a digital synthesizer

de:CIE-Normvalenzsystem#Die Standardbeleuchtung